Drosophila yakuba is an African species of fruit fly that is predominantly found in open savanna, and was one of 12 fruit fly genomes sequenced for a large comparative study.

References

External links 
 Drosophila yakuba at FlyBase
 Drosophila yakuba at Ensembl Genomes Metazoa
 Drosophila yakuba sequenced by the Genome Sequencing Center, Washington University School of Medicine in St. Louis
 

y
Diptera of Africa